The palmflies are a common Asian butterfly genus found from India to the Solomon Islands. The caterpillars mimic leaves which they feed on. The adults mimic certain species (for example: E. cumaea looks like Melanitis leda).

Species
Listed alphabetically.
Elymnias agondas (Boisduval, 1832) – palmfly
Elymnias amoena Tsukada & Nishiyama, 1979
Elymnias beza (Hewitson, 1877)
Elymnias brookei Shelford, 1904
Elymnias casiphone Geyer, [1827]
Elymnias casiphonides Semper, 1892
Elymnias caudata Butler, 1871
Elymnias ceryx (Boisduval, 1836)
Elymnias congruens Semper, 1887
Elymnias cottonis (Hewitson, 1874)
Elymnias cumaea C. & R. Felder, [1867]
Elymnias cybele (C. & R. Felder, 1860)
Elymnias dara Distant & Pryer, 1887
Elymnias detanii Aoki & Uémura, 1982
Elymnias esaca (Westwood, 1851)
Elymnias harterti Honrath, 1889
Elymnias hewitsoni Wallace, 1869 – Hewitson's palmfly
Elymnias hicetas Wallace, 1869
Elymnias holofernes (Butler, 1882)
Elymnias hypermnestra (Linnaeus, 1763) – common palmfly
Elymnias kamara Moore, [1858]
Elymnias kanekoi Tsukada & Nishiyama, 1980
Elymnias kuenstleri Honrath, [1885]
Elymnias lise (Hemming, 1960)
Elymnias luteofasciata Okubo, 1980
Elymnias malelas (Hewitson, 1863)
Elymnias melias (C. & R. Felder, 1863)
Elymnias mimalon (Hewitson, 1861)
Elymnias nelsoni Corbet, 1942
Elymnias nepheronides Fruhstorfer, 1907
Elymnias nesaea (Linnaeus, 1764) – tiger palmfly
Elymnias obnubila Marshall & de Nicéville, 1883
Elymnias panthera (Fabricius, 1787) – tawny palmfly
Elymnias papua Wallace, 1869
Elymnias paradoxa Staudinger, 1894
Elymnias patna (Westwood, 1851) – blue-striped palmfly
Elymnias pealii Wood-Mason, 1883 – Peal's palmfly
Elymnias pellucida Fruhstorfer, 1895
Elymnias penanga (Westwood, 1851) – pointed palmfly
Elymnias sangira Fruhstorfer, 1899
Elymnias singhala Moore, [1875] – Ceylon palmfly
Elymnias tamborana Okubo, 2010
Elymnias vasudeva Moore, 1857 – Jezebel palmfly
Elymnias vitellia (Stoll, [1781])

Formerly in Elymnias:
Elymniopsis bammakoo Westwood, 1851 – African palmfly

Mimicry
Several species are mimics:
Taenaris catops – E. agondas
Euploea mulciber – E. kuenstleri
Danaus chrysippus – E. hypermnestra
Idea leuconoe – E. kuenstleri
Delias pasithoe – E. esaca
Parantica melaneus – E. ceryx

See also
Elymniopsis

References

External links
Examples of mimicry

 
Butterfly genera
Taxa named by Jacob Hübner